Peter Owen is a make-up artist.

Peter Owen may also refer to:

Peter Owen (publisher) (1927–2016), British publisher
Peter Owen Publishers, a London-based publisher founded in 1951
Peter Owen (actor) in Miss Mabel
Peter Owen (racer) in 2000 Sports Racing World Cup season
Peter Francis Owen, honoured in 1990 New Year Honours

See also
Peter Owen-Jones (born 1957), English clergyman, author and TV presenter